Çal is a town and a district of Denizli Province in the inner Aegean region of Turkey. Çal district area occupies a central position in the northern part of its province and neighbors the central district of Denizli to the south-west and the district areas of Güney to the west and Honaz to the south. To the east of Çal district lies clockwise the districts of Bekilli, Çivril and Baklan. 

The population of the town is 3946 and the whole district is 22,249.

General features
Roman remains have been found in the area. Hançalar Bridge over Menderes River, at the level of the township of the same name, situated between Çal and Bekilli, is reminiscent of Roman bridges by its style, while the builder remains unknown. It was repaired and restored several times during the Ottoman era. The first Turks in the area were the Seljuk Turks in 1072, who settled in all parts of the present-day Denizli Province, including Çal. 

The area is largely agricultural and is known especially for its vineyards. The local grape variety Çalkarası and grown intensively and takes its name from the district. Çal also has an annual wine festival. There is also a cement factory, a fruit-juice factory and various cold-stores for fruit.

Sakızcılar Falls and the "Weeping Stone"
A notable sight of interest are the waterfalls near the depending village of Sakızcılar, on the slopes of the Mount Çal (Çaldağı) and at a distance of about  when coming from Pamukkale. Water of a stream that later joins Menderes River fall from 50 meters high at this locality and the whole area is covered with forests, making it a notable natural site. It is also a large trout farm. The falls are alternatively called "Yeşildere Falls" or "Ağlayan Kaya" (the weeping stone).

Notable natives
The people of Çal acquired a fame for their astuteness and alertness in the region. They are hard-working and stubborn, and also raised crafty horsethieves in the past. There is an old regional saying that goes, if you put a snake in a sack with a man from Çal, the snake will beg to be taken out. 

The renowned painter İbrahim Çallı was born here, as his name indicates. 

The award-winning author and poet  Mahmut Alptekin is from Çal.  He was born there and spent some of his childhood in Çal. 

The award-winning academic, psychiatrist and author Dr. Erol Göka is from Çal.

The award-winning author and poet  Hasan Ali Toptaş is from Çal.

See also
 Çalkarası grape variety

Footnotes

Image gallery

External links
 
 A local news website
 Website of the district of Çal 

Populated places in Denizli Province
Districts of Denizli Province